What Happened to Jones is a lost 1915 silent film directed by and starring Fred Mace. It is based on George Broadhurst's 1897 play What Happened to Jones. William A. Brady was the producer.

The film's exterior scenes were filmed in the Jacksonville, Florida area.

Cast
Bradley Barker - Col. Filbert
Chester Barnett - Richard Heatherly
Marjorie Blossom - Minerve
Mary Charleson - Marjorie
Joseph Daly - Bishop of Timbuctoo (*as Joe Daly)
Fred Mace - Jones
William Mandeville - Professor Ebeneezer Goodly
Leonora Organ - Cissy (*as Leonia Morgan)
Caroline Rankin - Alvina Starlight (*as Carolyn Rankin
Josie Sadler - Helma

References

External links
 What Happened to Jones at IMDb.com

1915 films
American silent feature films
American films based on plays
Lost American films
American black-and-white films
World Film Company films
Films shot in Florida
1910s American films